Events from the year 1980 in Pakistan.

Incumbents

Federal government 
President: Muhammad Zia-ul-Haq
Chief Justice: Sheikh Anwarul Haq

Governors 
Governor of Balochistan: Rahimuddin Khan 
Governor of Khyber Pakhtunkhwa: Fazle Haq 
Governor of Punjab: Sawar Khan (until 1 May); Ghulam Jilani Khan (starting 1 May)
Governor of Sindh: S.M. Abbasi

Events 
 The United States pledges military assistance to Pakistan following Soviet intervention in Afghanistan.

See also
1979 in Pakistan
1981 in Pakistan
List of Pakistani films of 1980
Timeline of Pakistani history

External links
Timeline: Pakistan - BBC news

 
1980 in Asia